MUC, Muc or Muć may refer to:

Places
Muć, a village and municipality in Split-Dalmatia County, Croatia
Munich Airport (IATA airport code), Munich, Germany
Munich-Riem Airport, a 1939–1992 airport in Munich, Germany
Montreal Urban Community, a dissolved regional government in Quebec, Canada

Awards
Meritorious Unit Citation, an Australian military award
Meritorious Unit Commendation, a United States military award

Education
Minzu University of China, Beijing, China
Mount Union College (now University of Mount Union), Alliance, Ohio, United States
Morris University Center of the Southern Illinois University Edwardsville, Edwardsville, Illinois, United States

Science
MUC1, Mucin 1, a protein
Metastatic urothelial carcinoma, a type of cancer
Mixed urethral contamination, where more than one type of organism is present in a clean-catch urine sample, but no strain predominates

Sports and entertainment
Le Mans Union Club 72, a French association football club
Magic User's Club, an anime series
Miracle Ultraviolence Connection, in pro wrestling
MUC, a 2003 album by Tomcraft
Manitoba Underwater Council, the governing body of Underwater football

Other uses
Message Understanding Conference, an information extraction competition
Multi-user chat, a synchronous online conference with multiple participants

See also
SuperMUC, a supercomputer of the Leibniz Supercomputing Centre of the Bavarian Academy of Sciences